A surprise attack is an act of military deception.

Surprise Attack may also refer to:
 Surprise Attack, a 1989 album by Tora Tora
 Surprise Attack (film), a 1951 short film
 Surprise Attack, a 1990 game by Konami
 "Surprise Attack!", a 1985 episode of The Raccoons

See also 
 Surprise Attack Records